Dafydd ap Maredudd ap Tudur was a Welsh poet in the later 15th century.

Tudur's works include religious poems, and eulogies of Dafydd ab Owain (abbot of Strata Marcella), Dafydd Deuddwr, Hywel Colunwy, and Watcyn ap Tomas ap Rhoser.

References 

Welsh male poets
Welsh religious writers
Date of birth unknown
Date of death unknown
15th-century Welsh poets